Per Nygårds (born 22 December 1965) is a retired Swedish ice hockey player. Nygårds was part of the Djurgården Swedish champions' team of 1991. Nygårds made 67 Elitserien appearances for Djurgården.

References

Swedish ice hockey players
Djurgårdens IF Hockey players
1965 births
Living people